Emblemaria hypacanthus, the Gulf signal blenny, is a species of chaenopsid blenny known from the Gulf of California, in the eastern central Pacific ocean. It can reach a maximum length of  TL. This species feeds primarily on zooplankton.

References
 Jenkins, O.P., and B.W. Evermann, 1889 (5 Jan.) Description of eighteen new species of fishes from the Gulf of California. Proceedings of the United States National Museum v. 11 (no. 698): 137–158.

External links
 

hypacanthus
Fish described in 1889
Taxa named by Oliver Peebles Jenkins